1852 Carpenter, provisional designation , is an Eoan asteroid from the outer regions of the asteroid belt, approximately 20 kilometers in diameter. The asteroid was discovered on 1 April 1955, by the Indiana Asteroid Program at Goethe Link Observatory near Brooklyn, Indiana, United States.

Description 

Carpenter is a core member of the Eos family, the largest asteroid family in the outer main belt consisting of nearly 10,000 asteroids. It orbits the Sun in the outer main-belt at a distance of 2.8–3.2 AU once every 5 years and 3 months (1,913 days). Its orbit has an eccentricity of 0.06 and an inclination of 11° with respect to the ecliptic.

This minor planet was named after American astronomer Edwin Francis Carpenter (1898–1963), second director of the Steward Observatory who researched spectroscopic binaries and interacting galaxies. He played a major role in enabling the construction of the Kitt Peak National Observatory. The official  was published by the Minor Planet Center on 1 April 1980.

References

External links 
 Dictionary of Minor Planet Names, Google books* Asteroid Lightcurve Database (LCDB), query form (info )
 Discovery Circumstances: Numbered Minor Planets (1)-(5000) – Minor Planet Center
 
 

001852
001852
Named minor planets
19550401